The 1947 Eastern Illinois Panthers football team represented Eastern Illinois University as a member of the Illinois Intercollegiate Athletic Conference (IIAC) during the 1947 college football season. The team was led by second-year head coach Maynard O'Brien and played their home games at Schahrer Field in Charleston, Illinois. The Panthers finished the season with a 2–6 record overall and a 2–2 record in conference play.

Schedule

References

Eastern Illinois
Eastern Illinois Panthers football seasons
Eastern Illinois Panthers football